Qualification for tennis at the 2020 Summer Olympics in Tokyo, Japan was determined primarily by the rankings maintained by the Association of Tennis Professionals (ATP) and the Women's Tennis Association (WTA).

Qualifying criteria
The main qualifying criterion will be players' positions on the ATP and WTA ranking lists published on 14 June 2021 (after 2021 French Open). The players entering were formally submitted by the International Tennis Federation. The ATP and WTA rankings were based on performances from the previous 52 weeks, and there were several tournaments in the two-month period between the time of the rankings being frozen for entry and the beginning of the tennis events at the Olympics. Players had to be part of a nominated team for three Billie Jean King Cup (women) or Davis Cup (men) events between the 2016 and 2020 Olympics. This requirement was reduced to two Fed/Davis Cup events during the Olympic cycle from 2016 to 2020 if their nation competed at the Zone Group round robin level for three of the four years or if the player had represented their nation at least twenty times. All players were required to have been part of a nominated team for a Fed/Davis Cup event in 2019 or 2020, and to have had a good standing with their National Olympic Committee.

Each National Olympic Committee (NOC) could enter 6 male and 6 female athletes, with a maximum of 4 entries in the individual events, and 2 pairs in the doubles events. A total of 172 athletes will qualify to compete.

For the singles competitions, the top 56 players in the world rankings on a later date to be announced of the WTA and ATP tours are qualified for the Olympics. However, entry has been limited to four players from a country.  This means that players who are ranked in the top 56 but represent the NOCs with four higher-ranked players already participating do not qualify, allowing players who are ranked outside of the top 56 but from countries with fewer than four players already qualified to compete. A player could only participate if they been part of a final nominated team to represent their country in Davis Cup or Billie Jean King Cup (formerly known as Fed Cup) ties on three occasions during the olympic cycle, with one of the years featuring a nomination being either 2019 or 2020–21. The required nominations was reduced to two if the player represented a nation spending at least three of the four seasons in the Olympic cycle on the zonal level of the relevant Cup or had been nominated for at least 20 ties during their career. Six of the remaining eight slots will be allocated by continent: two in the 2019 Pan American Games, one in the 2018 Asian Games, one in the 2019 African Games, and one each for Europe and Oceania for the highest-ranked athlete from an NOC with no other qualifiers. The final two spots are reserved, one for the host nation and one for a previous Olympic gold medalist or Grand Slam champion who didn't secure a direct entry.

In the men's and women's doubles competitions, 32 teams qualify. Up to 10 places are reserved for players in the top 10 of the doubles ranking, who could select any player from their NOC ranked in the top 300. Slots were then allocated to teams with the best combined ranking until 24 teams had been qualified. If the quota of 86 players in the relevant gender had not yet been met, additional places continued to be allotted via combined ranking. Once the quota was met, remaining teams with both players qualified in the singles were selected based on their best combined ranking. If this resulted in fewer than 32 teams, additional places were assigned to teams with one player qualified in singles, followed by remaining teams without any singles-qualified players if necessary. One team per gender was reserved for the host nation.

No quota spots are available for mixed doubles; instead, all teams have to consist of players already on site having qualified in the singles or doubles. Fifteen teams, based on combined ranking, and the host nation qualified.

Qualified players

Men's singles

Women's singles

Men's doubles

 Combined ranking. The best ranking (singles or doubles) of Player A is added to that of Player B to calculate the combined ranking.

 Singles ranking on 14 June 2021.

 Doubles ranking on 14 June 2021.

Women's doubles

 Combined ranking. The best ranking (singles or doubles) of Player A is added to that of Player B to calculate the combined ranking.

 Singles ranking on 14 June 2021.

 Doubles ranking on 14 June 2021.

Mixed doubles

 Combined ranking. The best ranking (singles or doubles) of Player A is added to that of Player B to calculate the combined ranking.

 Singles ranking on 14 June 2021.

 Doubles ranking on 14 June 2021.

Notes

References

External links
 Tokyo Olympics 2020 – Entry list from the International Tennis Federation

Qualification for the 2020 Summer Olympics
Tennis at the 2020 Summer Olympics
Qualification for tennis tournaments